Teretrius is a genus of clown beetles in the family Histeridae. There are at least 70 described species in Teretrius.

Species
These 77 species belong to the genus Teretrius:

References

Further reading

 
 
 
 
 
 
 
 
 

Histeridae